Motshekga is a surname. Notable people with the surname include: 

Angie Motshekga (born 1955), South African politician
Mathole Motshekga (born 1949), South African politician and lawyer